Wanu Wanu (Aymara and Quechua wanu dung, fertilizer, "a lot of dung", hispanicized spelling Huanu Huanu) is a mountain in the Andes of Peru, about  high. It is located in the Cusco Region, Espinar Province, on the border of the districts of Condoroma and Ocoruro. It lies northeast of Atawallpa and southeast of Hatun Chhuka.

References

Mountains of Peru
Mountains of Cusco Region